The following lists the episodes, air dates and summaries of the animated adaption of Hoshizora e Kakaru Hashi.

Footnotes
a.  The god as described in the story's Futagoyama legend.
b.  The goddess as described in the story's Futagoyama legend.

References

Hoshizora